Union Township is an inactive township in Ripley County, in the U.S. state of Missouri.

Union Township was erected in 1871.

References

Townships in Missouri
Townships in Ripley County, Missouri